was an admiral in the Imperial Japanese Navy during World War II. He was the last Commander-in-Chief of the Combined Fleet.

Notes

Further reading

External links 
 Post-war interrogations on 16 October 1945 and 30 October 1945

1886 births
1966 deaths
People from Miyazaki Prefecture
Imperial Japanese Navy admirals
Japanese admirals of World War II